Tin(II) stearate is a metal-organic compound with the chemical formula . The compound is classified as a metallic soap, i.e. a metal derivative of a fatty acid (stearic acid).

Physical properties
Tin(II) stearate forms colorless (white) crystals.

The compound is insoluble in water.

Chemical properties
Tin(II) stearate reacts with sodium hydroxide solution or hydrochloric acid to form the tin(II) chloride or tin(II) chloride hydroxide.

Uses
The compound is used in the pharmaceuticals and cosmetics industries as a thickener, film-forming polymer, and release agent.

References

Stearates
Tin compounds